Shin Seung-ho (born 11 November 1995) is a South Korean actor and model. As one of the leads, Shin received the most attention after appearing on A-Teen (2018). He is also known for appearing on Love Alarm (2019) and Alchemy of Souls (2022).

Filmography

Film

Television series

Web series

Awards and nominations

References

External links 
 Shin Seung-ho 
 
 

1995 births
Living people
South Korean male actors
South Korean male television actors
South Korean male web series actors
King Kong by Starship artists